Roger Margason, who used the pseudonym of Dorien Grey, was an openly gay American author, (born in Northern Illinois). Margason served in the U.S. Navy and graduated from Northern Illinois University with a BA in English. He died on November 1, 2015.

Margason was the author of the fourteen-book Dick Hardesty mystery series, which received a WordWeaving Series of Excellence award, and four of which have been finalists for the Lambda Literary Award.  He was also the author of the four-book Elliott Smith Paranormal Mystery series.  In addition to his two series, he had a stand-alone gay western/romance/adventure novel, Calico, aimed at young adults and traditional western buffs; Short Circuits: A Life in Blogs; Dreams of a Calico Mouse, a book of poetry; and A World Ago: a Navy Man's Letters Home, 1954-1956.

All his books are in the process of becoming audiobooks.

Works
 The Dick Hardesty Mystery Series
 The Butcher's Son† (2000) 
 The Ninth Man (2000) 
 The Bar Watcher (2001) 
 The Hired Man† (2002) 
 The Good Cop (2002) 
 The Bottle Ghosts (2003) 
 The Dirt Peddler (2003) 
 The Role Players† 
 The Popsicle Tree (2005) 
 The Paper Mirror† (2005) 
 The Dream Ender (2007) 
 The Angel Singers (2008) 
 The Secret Keeper (2009) 
 The Peripheral Son (2011) 
 The Serpent's Tongue (2014) 

 The Elliott Smith Mysteries Series
 His Name Is John (2008) 
 Aaron's Wait (2009) 
 Caesar's Fall (2010) 
 Dante's Circle (2012) 

 Other works
 Calico (2006) 
 Short Circuits: A Life in Blogs (2011) ASIN: B00584R12S
 A World Ago: a Navy Man's Letters Home, 1954-1956 (2012) 

† Denotes Lambda Literary Award finalists

References

External links
 The World of Dorien Grey
 "Dorien Grey and Me" blog 
 "A World Ago" blog
 "Dorien Grey: A Life in Photos" blog
 Dorien Grey at AuthorsDen at Amazon.com

2015 deaths

Year of birth missing
American mystery writers

American gay writers
American LGBT novelists
American male novelists

Northern Illinois University alumni
Western (genre) writers